Szymkowiak is a Polish surname. Notable people include:
 Edward Szymkowiak (1932-1990), Polish footballer
 Janina Szymkowiak, Polish beatified nun
 Jules Szymkowiak, Dutch racing driver
 Kerstin Szymkowiak (born 1977), German skeleton racer
 Mirosław Szymkowiak (born 1976), Polish footballer
 Tomasz Szymkowiak (born 1983), Polish athlete

Polish-language surnames